Bringing Up Baby is a 1938 American screwball comedy film directed by Howard Hawks, and starring Katharine Hepburn and Cary Grant. It was released by RKO Radio Pictures. The film tells the story of a paleontologist in a number of predicaments involving a scatterbrained heiress and a leopard named Baby. The screenplay was adapted by Dudley Nichols and Hagar Wilde from a short story by Wilde which originally appeared in Collier's Weekly magazine on April 10, 1937.

The script was written specifically for Hepburn, and tailored to her personality. Filming began in September 1937 and wrapped in January 1938, over schedule and over budget. Production was frequently delayed by uncontrollable laughing fits between Hepburn and Grant. Hepburn struggled with her comedic performance and was coached by another cast member, vaudeville veteran Walter Catlett. A tame leopard was used during the shooting; its trainer stood off-screen with a whip for all of its scenes.

Bringing Up Baby was a commercial flop at release, although it eventually made a small profit after its re-release in the early 1940s. Shortly after the film's premiere, Hepburn was one of a group of actors labeled as "box office poison" by the Independent Theatre Owners of America. Her career would not recover until The Philadelphia Story two years later. The film's reputation began to grow during the 1950s when it was shown on television.

Since then, the film has gained acclaim from both critics and audiences for its zany antics and pratfalls, absurd situations and misunderstandings, perfect sense of comic timing, completely screwball cast, series of lunatic and hare-brained misadventures, disasters, light-hearted surprises and romantic comedy.

In 1990, Bringing Up Baby was selected for preservation in the National Film Registry of the Library of Congress as "culturally, historically, or aesthetically significant," and it has appeared on a number of greatest-films lists, ranking 88th on the American Film Institute's 100 greatest American films of all time list.

Plot
David Huxley (Cary Grant) is a mild-mannered paleontologist. For the past four years, he has been trying to assemble the skeleton of a Brontosaurus but is missing one bone: the "intercostal clavicle."  Adding to his stress is his impending marriage to the dour Alice Swallow (Virginia Walker) and the need to impress Elizabeth Random (May Robson), who is considering a million-dollar donation to his museum.

The day before his wedding, David meets Susan Vance (Katharine Hepburn) by chance on a golf course when she plays his ball. She is a free-spirited, somewhat scatterbrained, young lady, unfettered by logic. These qualities soon embroil David in several frustrating incidents.

Susan's brother Mark has sent her a tame leopard named Baby (Nissa) from Brazil. Its tameness is helped by hearing the song "I Can't Give You Anything But Love". Susan thinks David is a zoologist, and manipulates him into accompanying her in taking Baby to her farm in Connecticut. Complications arise when Susan falls in love with him, and she tries to keep him at her house as long as possible, even hiding his clothes, to prevent his imminent marriage.

David's prized intercostal clavicle is delivered, but Susan's aunt's dog George (Skippy) takes it and buries it somewhere. When Susan's aunt arrives, she discovers David in a negligee. To David's dismay, she turns out to be potential donor Elizabeth Random. A second message from Mark makes clear the leopard is for Elizabeth, as she always wanted one. Baby and George run off. The zoo is called to help capture Baby. Susan and David race to find Baby before the zoo and, mistaking a dangerous leopard (also portrayed by Nissa) from a nearby circus for Baby, they let it out of its cage.

David and Susan are jailed by a befuddled town policeman, Constable Slocum (Walter Catlett), for acting strangely at the house of Dr. Fritz Lehman (Fritz Feld), where they had cornered the circus leopard, thinking it was Baby. When Slocum does not believe their story, Susan tells him they are members of the "Leopard Gang"; she calls herself "Swingin' Door Susie," and David "Jerry the Nipper."  Eventually, Alexander Peabody (George Irving) shows up to verify everyone's identity. Susan, who escaped out of a window during a police interview, unwittingly drags the highly irritated circus leopard into the jail. David saves her, using a chair to shoo the big cat into a cell.

Some time later, Susan finds David, who has been jilted by Alice because of her, on a high platform working on his brontosaurus reconstruction at the museum. After showing him the missing bone which she found by trailing George for three days, Susan, against his warnings, climbs a tall ladder next to the dinosaur to be closer to him. She tells David that her aunt has given her the million dollars, and she wants to donate it to the museum, but David is more interested in telling her that the day spent with her was the best day of his life. They declare their love for each other, and Susan, distracted by the moment, unconsciously swings the ladder from side to side. As they talk, and the ladder sways more and more with each swing, Susan and David finally notice that Susan is in danger. Frightened, she climbs onto the skeleton, causing it to creak, and then collapse. David grabs her hand just as she falls, lifts her onto the platform, and halfheartedly complains about the loss of his years of work on his Brontosaurus as she talks him into forgiving her. Resigning himself to a future of chaos, David embraces and kisses Susan.

Cast

 Katharine Hepburn as Susan Vance
 Cary Grant as Dr. David Huxley (alias Mr. Bone)
 May Robson as Elizabeth Carlton Random, Susan's aunt
 Charles Ruggles as Major Horace Applegate, a big-game hunter
 Walter Catlett as Constable Slocum
 Barry Fitzgerald as Aloysius Gogarty, Mrs. Random's gardener
 Fritz Feld as Dr. Fritz Lehman, an affluent psychiatrist
 Virginia Walker as Alice Swallow, David's fiancée
 George Irving as Alexander Peabody, Mrs. Random's lawyer
 Leona Roberts as Hannah Gogarty, Aloysius's wife and Mrs. Random's servant
 Tala Birell as Mrs. Lehman, Dr. Lehman's wife
 John Kelly as Elmer, Constable Slocum's assistant

Uncredited
 D'Arcy Corrigan as Professor LaTouche
 Billy Bevan as Tom, the barkeeper
 Billy Franey as the butcher
 Billy Benedict as David's caddy
 Dick Lane as the circus manager
 Ward Bond as a motorcycle policeman
 Jack Carson as a circus roustabout

Animals
 Skippy as George, Mrs. Random's dog
 Nissa as Baby and the circus leopard

Production

Development and writing

In March 1937, Howard Hawks signed a contract at RKO for an adaptation of Rudyard Kipling's Gunga Din, which had been in pre-production since the previous fall. When RKO was unable to borrow Clark Gable, Spencer Tracy and Franchot Tone from Metro-Goldwyn-Mayer for the film and the adaptation of Gunga Din was delayed, Hawks began looking for a new project. In April 1937, he read a short story by Hagar Wilde in Collier's magazine called "Bringing Up Baby" and immediately wanted to make a film from it, remembering that it made him laugh out loud. RKO bought the screen rights in June for $1,004, and Hawks worked briefly with Wilde on the film's treatment. Wilde's short story differed significantly from the film: David and Susan are engaged, he is not a scientist and there is no dinosaur, intercostal clavicle or museum. However, Susan gets a pet panther from her brother Mark to give to their Aunt Elizabeth; David and Susan must capture the panther in the Connecticut wilderness with the help of Baby's favorite song, "I Can't Give You Anything but Love, Baby".

Hawks then hired screenwriter Dudley Nichols, best known for his work with director John Ford, for the script. Wilde would develop the characters and comedic elements of the script, while Nichols would take care of the story and structure. Hawks worked with the two writers during summer 1937, and they came up with a 202-page script. Wilde and Nichols wrote several drafts together, beginning a romantic relationship and co-authoring the Fred Astaire and Ginger Rogers film Carefree a few months later. The Bringing Up Baby script underwent several changes, and at one point there was an elaborate pie fight, inspired by Mack Sennett films. Major Applegate had an assistant and food taster named Ali (which was intended to be played by Mischa Auer), but this character was replaced with Aloysius Gogarty. The script's final draft had several scenes in the middle of the film in which David and Susan declare their love for each other which Hawks cut  during production.

Nichols was instructed to write the film for Hepburn, with whom he had worked on John Ford's Mary of Scotland (1936). Barbara Leaming alleged that Ford had an affair with Hepburn, and claims that many of the characteristics of Susan and David were based on Hepburn and Ford. Nichols was in touch with Ford during the screenwriting, and the film included such members of the John Ford Stock Company as Ward Bond, Barry Fitzgerald, D'Arcy Corrigan and associate producer Cliff Reid. John Ford was a friend of Hawks, and visited the set. The round glasses Grant wears in the film are reminiscent of Harold Lloyd and of Ford.

Filming was scheduled to begin on September 1, 1937 and wrap on October 31, but was delayed for several reasons. Production had to wait until mid-September to clear the rights for "I Can't Give You Anything but Love, Baby" for $1,000. In August, Hawks hired gag writers Robert McGowan and Gertrude Purcell for uncredited script rewrites, and McGowan added a scene inspired by the comic strip Professor Dinglehoofer and his Dog in which a dog buries a rare dinosaur bone. RKO paid King Features $1,000 to use the idea for the film on September 21.

Unscripted ad-lib by Grant
It has been debated whether Bringing Up Baby is the first fictional work (apart from pornography) to use the word gay in a homosexual context. In one scene, Cary Grant's character is wearing a woman's marabou-trimmed négligée; when asked why, he replies exasperatedly "Because I just went gay all of a sudden!" (leaping into the air at the word gay). As the term gay was not familiar to the general public until the Stonewall riots in 1969, it is questioned whether the word is used by Grant in its original sense (meaning "happy") or is an intentional, joking reference to homosexuality.

The line in the film was an ad-lib by Grant, and was not in the script. According to Vito Russo in The Celluloid Closet (1981, revised 1987), the script originally had Grant's character say "I...I suppose you think it's odd, my wearing this. I realize it looks odd...I don't usually...I mean, I don't own one of these". Russo suggests that this indicates that people in Hollywood (at least in Grant's circles) were familiar with the slang connotations of the word; however, neither Grant nor anyone involved in the film suggested this.

The 1933 film My Weakness had previously used the word "gay" as an overt descriptor of homosexuality; one of two men pining away for the same woman suddenly suggests a solution to their mutual problem: "Let's be gay!"  However, the Studio Relations Committee censors decreed that the line was too risqué and had to be muffled.  The film This Side of Heaven (1934) included a scene in which a fussy, gossipy interior decorator tries to sell a floral fabric pattern to a customer, who knowingly replies, "It strikes me as a bit too gay."

Casting

After briefly considering Hawks' cousin Carole Lombard for the role of Susan Vance, producers chose Katharine Hepburn to play the wealthy New Englander because of her background and similarities to the character. RKO agreed to the casting, but had reservations because of Hepburn's salary and lack of box-office success for several years. Producer Lou Lusty said, "You couldn't even break even, if a Hepburn show cost eight hundred grand." At first, Hawks and producer Pandro S. Berman could not agree on whom to cast in the role of David Huxley. Hawks initially wanted silent-film comedian Harold Lloyd; Berman rejected Lloyd and Ronald Colman, offering the role to Robert Montgomery, Fredric March and Ray Milland (all of whom turned it down).

Hawks' friend Howard Hughes finally suggested Cary Grant for the role. Grant had just finished shooting his breakthrough romantic comedy The Awful Truth (1937), and Hawks may have seen a rough cut of the unreleased film. Grant then had a non-exclusive, four-picture deal with RKO for $50,000 per film, and Grant's manager used his casting in the film to renegotiate his contract, earning him $75,000 plus the bonuses Hepburn was receiving. Grant was concerned about being able to play an intellectual character and took two weeks to accept the role, despite the new contract. Hawks built Grant's confidence by promising to coach him throughout the film, instructing him to watch Harold Lloyd films for inspiration. Grant met with Howard Hughes throughout the film to discuss his character, which he said helped his performance.

Hawks obtained character actors Charlie Ruggles on loan from Paramount Pictures for Major Horace Applegate and Barry Fitzgerald on loan from The Mary Pickford Corporation to play gardener Aloysius Gogarty. Hawks cast Virginia Walker as Alice Swallow, David's fiancée; Walker was under contract to him and later married his brother William Hawks. As Hawks could not find a panther that would work for the film, Baby was changed to a leopard so they could cast the trained leopard Nissa, who had worked in films for eight years, making several B-movies.

Filming
Shooting began September 23, 1937, and was scheduled to end November 20, 1937, on a budget of $767,676. Filming began in-studio with the scenes in Susan's apartment, moving to the Bel Air Country Club in early October for the golf-course scenes. The production had a difficult start due to Hepburn's struggles with her character and her comedic abilities. She frequently overacted, trying too hard to be funny, and Hawks asked vaudeville veteran Walter Catlett to help coach her. Catlett acted out scenes with Grant for Hepburn, showing her that he was funnier when he was serious. Hepburn understood, acted naturally and played herself for the rest of the shoot; she was so impressed by Catlett's talent and coaching ability that she insisted he play Constable Slocum in the film.

Most shooting was done at the Arthur Ranch in the San Fernando Valley, which was used as Aunt Elizabeth's estate for interior and exterior scenes. Beginning at the Arthur Ranch shoot, Grant and Hepburn often ad-libbed their dialogue and frequently delayed production by making each other laugh. The scene where Grant frantically asks Hepburn where his bone is was shot from 10 am until well after 4 pm because of the stars' laughing fits. After one month of shooting Hawks was seven days behind schedule. During the filming, Hawks would refer to four different versions of the film's script and make frequent changes to scenes and dialogue. His leisurely attitude on set and shutting down production to see a horse race contributed to the lost time.  He took twelve days to shoot the Westlake jail scene instead of the scheduled five. Hawks later facetiously blamed the setbacks on his two stars' laughing fits and having to work with two animal actors.

The terrier George was played by Skippy, known as Asta in The Thin Man film series and co-starring with Grant (as Mr. Smith) in The Awful Truth. The tame leopard Baby and the escaped circus leopard were both played by a trained leopard, Nissa. The big cat was supervised by its trainer, Olga Celeste, who stood by with a whip during shooting. At one point, when Hepburn spun around (causing her skirt to twirl) Nissa lunged at her and was subdued when Celeste cracked her whip. Hepburn wore heavy perfume to keep Nissa calm and was unafraid of the leopard, but Grant was terrified; most scenes of the two interacting are done in close-up with a stand-in. Hepburn played upon his fear by throwing a toy leopard through the roof of Grant's dressing room during production. There were several news reports about Hawks' difficulty filming the live leopard, and the potential danger to highly valuable actors, so some scenes required rear-screen projection, while several others were shot using traveling mattes. In a scene where Grant has Baby on a leash, it is quite obvious that the leash was hand painted on film because it proved impossible to make the two parts of the leash join in the traveling matte.

Hawks and Hepburn had a confrontation one day during shooting. While Hepburn was chatting with a crew member, Hawks yelled "Quiet!" until the only person still talking was Hepburn. When Hepburn paused and realized that everyone was looking at her, she asked what was the matter. Hawks asked her if she was finished imitating a parrot. Hepburn took Hawks aside, telling him never to talk to her like that again since she was old friends with most of the crew. When Hawks (an even older friend of the crew) asked a lighting tech whom he would rather drop a light on, Hepburn agreed to behave on set. A variation of this scene, with Grant yelling "Quiet!", was incorporated into the film.

The Westlake Street set was shot at 20th Century Fox Studios. Filming was eventually completed on January 6, 1938 with the scenes outside Mr. Peabody's house. RKO producers expressed concern about the film's delays and expense, coming in 40 days over schedule and $330,000 over budget, and also disliked Grant's glasses and Hepburn's hair. The film's final cost was $1,096,796.23, primarily due to overtime clauses in Hawks', Grant's and Hepburn's contracts. The film's cost for sets and props was only $5,000 over budget, but all actors (including Nissa and Skippy) were paid approximately double their initial salaries. Hepburn's salary rose from $72,500 to $121,680.50, Grant's salary from $75,000 to $123,437.50 and Hawks' salary from $88,046.25 to $202,500. The director received an additional $40,000 to terminate his RKO contract on March 21, 1938.

Post-production and previews
Hawks' editor, George Hively, cut the film during production and the final prints were made a few days after shooting ended. The first cut of the film (10,150 feet long) was sent to the Hayes Office in mid-January. Despite several double entendres and sexual references it passed the film, overlooking Grant saying he "went gay" or Hepburn's reference to George urinating. The censor's only objections were to the scene where Hepburn's dress is torn, and references to politicians (such as Al Smith and Jim Farley).

Like all Hawks' comedies, the film is fast paced (despite being filmed primarily in long medium shots, with little cross-cutting). Hawks told Peter Bogdanovich, "You get more pace if you pace the actors quickly within the frame rather than cross cutting fast".

By February 18, the film had been cut to 9,204 feet. It had two advance previews in January 1938, where it received either As or A-pluses on audience-feedback cards. Producer Pandro S. Berman wanted to cut five more minutes, but relented when Hawks, Grant and Cliff Reid objected. At the film's second preview, the film received rave reviews and RKO expected a hit. The film's musical score is minimal, primarily Grant and Hepburn singing "I Can't Give You Anything But Love, Baby". There is incidental music in the Ritz scene, and an arrangement of "I Can't Give You Anything But Love, Baby" during the opening and closing credits by musical director Roy Webb.

Reception

Critical response

The film was premiered on February 16, 1938 at the Golden Gate Theatre in San Francisco, before receiving a wide release on November 23, 1938. It received good advance reviews, with Otis Ferguson of The New Republic writing the film was very funny, and praising Hawks' direction. Variety also praised the film, singling out Hawks' pacing and direction, calling Hepburn's performance "one of her most invigorating screen characterizations" and saying Grant "performs his role to the hilt"; their only criticism was the length of the jail scene. Film Daily called it "literally [sic] a riot from beginning to end, with the laugh total heavy and the action fast." Harrison's Reports called the film "An excellent farce" with "many situations that provoke hearty laughter," and John Mosher of The New Yorker wrote that both stars "manage to be funny" and that Hepburn had never "seemed so good-natured." However, Frank S. Nugent of The New York Times disliked the film, considering it derivative and cliché-ridden, a rehash of dozens of other screwball comedies of the period. He labeled Hepburn's performance "breathless, senseless, and terribly, terribly fatiguing", and added, "If you've never been to the movies, Bringing Up Baby will be new to you – a zany-ridden product of the goofy-farce school. But who hasn't been to the movies?"

On review aggregator Rotten Tomatoes, the film holds an approval rating of 94% based on 52 reviews, with an average rating of 8.9/10. The site's critical consensus reads: "With Katharine Hepburn and Cary Grant at their effervescent best, Bringing Up Baby is a seamlessly assembled comedy with enduring appeal." On Metacritic, the film holds a weighted average score of 91 out of 100, based on 17 critics, indicating "universal acclaim".

Box office
Despite Bringing Up Babys reputation as a flop, it was successful in some parts of the U.S. The film premiered on February 16, 1938 at the Golden Gate Theatre in San Francisco (where it was a hit), and was also successful in Los Angeles, Portland, Denver, Cincinnati and Washington, D.C. However, it was a financial disappointment in the Midwest, as well as most other cities in the country, including NYC; to RKO's chagrin, the film's premiere in New York on March 3, 1938 at Radio City Music Hall made only $70,000 and it was pulled after one week in favor of Jezebel with Bette Davis.

During its first run, Bringing Up Baby made $715,000 in the U.S. and $394,000 in foreign markets for a total of $1,109,000; its reissue in 1940 and 1941 made an additional $95,000 in the US and $55,000 in foreign markets. Following its second run, the film made a profit of $163,000. Due to its perceived failure, Hawks was released early from his two-film contract with RKO and Gunga Din was eventually directed by George Stevens. Hawks later said the film "had a great fault and I learned an awful lot from that. There were no normal people in it. Everyone you met was a screwball and since that time I learned my lesson and don't intend ever again to make everybody crazy." The director went on to work with RKO on three films over the next decade. Long before Bringing Up Babys release, Hepburn had been branded "box office poison" by Harry Brandt (president of the Independent Theatre Owners of America) and thus was allowed to buy out her RKO contract for $22,000. However, many critics marveled at her new skill at low comedy; Life magazine called her "the surprise of the picture". Hepburn's former boyfriend Howard Hughes bought RKO in 1948, and sold it in 1955; when he sold the company, Hughes retained the copyright to six films (including Bringing Up Baby).

Legacy
Bringing Up Baby was the second of four films starring Grant and Hepburn; the others were Sylvia Scarlett (1935), Holiday (1938) and The Philadelphia Story (1940). The film's concept was described by philosopher Stanley Cavell as a "definitive achievement in the history of the art of film." Cavell noted that Bringing Up Baby was made in a tradition of romantic comedy with inspiration from ancient Rome and Shakespeare. Shakespeare's Much Ado About Nothing and As You Like It have been cited in particular as influences on the film and the screwball comedy in general, with their "haughty, self-sufficient men, strong women and fierce combat of words and wit." Hepburn's character has been cited as an early example of the Manic Pixie Dream Girl film archetype.

The popularity of Bringing Up Baby has increased since it was shown on television during the 1950s, and by the 1960s film analysts (including the writers at Cahiers du Cinéma in France) affirmed the film's quality. In a rebuttal of fellow New York Times critic Nugent's scathing review of the film at the time of release, A. O. Scott has said that you'll "find yourself amazed at its freshness, its vigor, and its brilliance-qualities undiminished after sixty-five years, and likely to withstand repeated viewings." Leonard Maltin stated that it is now "considered the definitive screwball comedy, and one of the fastest, funniest films ever made; grand performances by all."

Bringing Up Baby has been adapted several times. Hawks recycled the nightclub scene in which Hepburn's dress is torn and Grant walks behind her in the comedy Man's Favorite Sport (1964). Peter Bogdanovich's film  What's Up, Doc? (1972), starring Barbra Streisand and Ryan O'Neal, was intended as an homage to the film, and has contributed to its reputation. In the commentary track for Bringing Up Baby, Bogdanovich discusses how the coat-ripping scene in What's Up, Doc? was based on the scene in which Grant's coat and Hepburn's dress are torn in Bringing Up Baby.

The French film Une Femme ou Deux (English: One Woman or Two; 1985), starring  Gérard Depardieu, Sigourney Weaver, and Dr. Ruth Westheimer, is a rework of Bringing Up Baby. The film Who's That Girl? (1987), starring Madonna, is also loosely based on Bringing Up Baby.

In 1990 (the registry's second year), Bringing Up Baby was selected for preservation in the National Film Registry of the Library of Congress as "culturally, historically, or aesthetically significant". Entertainment Weekly voted the film 24th on its list of greatest films. In 2000, readers of Total Film magazine voted it the 47th-greatest comedy film of all time. Premiere ranked Cary Grant's performance as Dr. David Huxley 68th on its list of 100 all-time greatest performances, and ranked Susan Vance 21st on its list of 100 all-time greatest movie characters.

The National Society of Film Critics also included Bringing Up Baby in their "100 Essential Films", considering it to be arguably the director's best film.

The film is recognized by American Film Institute in these lists:

 1998: AFI's 100 Years...100 Movies – #97
 2000: AFI's 100 Years...100 Laughs – #14
 2002: AFI's 100 Years...100 Passions – #51
 2005: AFI's 100 Years...100 Movie Quotes:
 Dr. David Huxley: "It isn't that I don't like you, Susan, because after all, in moments of quiet, I'm strangely drawn toward you; but, well, there haven't been any quiet moments!" – Nominated
 2007: AFI's 100 Years...100 Movies (10th Anniversary Edition) – #88
 2008: AFI's 10 Top 10:
 Nominated Romantic Comedy Film

Notes

References

Bibliography

 
 
 
 
 
 
 
 
 
 
 

Further reading

External links

 
 
 
 Pauline Kael analysis
 Bringing Up Baby at moviediva
 Reprints of historic reviews, photo gallery at CaryGrant.net
 Bringing Up Baby on Theater of Romance: July 24, 1945
Bringing Up Baby essay by Michael Schlesinger on the National Film Registry site. 
Bringing Up Baby: Bones, Balls, and Butterflies an essay by Sheila O’Malley at the Criterion Collection

1930s screwball comedy films
1938 films
1938 romantic comedy films
American black-and-white films
American romantic comedy films
American screwball comedy films
Comedy of remarriage films
1930s English-language films
Films about animals
Films about cats
Films based on short fiction
Films based on works by Hagar Wilde
Films directed by Howard Hawks
Films produced by Cliff Reid
Films set in Connecticut
Films shot in California
Films shot in Los Angeles
Films with screenplays by Dudley Nichols
RKO Pictures films
United States National Film Registry films
1930s American films